Gonka III was a Telugu king and the fifth of Velanati Chodas who ruled from 1181 to 1186.

He succeeded his father Rajendra Choda II and he lost to Rudradeva II of Kakatiya and also to his rebel Kota Chieftain Ketaraja II. He was killed in 1186 in a battle with the Kakatiyas. Velanadu chiefs lost their capital and most parts of the Velanadu kingdom.

References
 Durga Prasad, History of the Andhras up to 1565 A. D., P. G. PUBLISHERS, GUNTUR (1988)
 South Indian Inscriptions - http://www.whatisindia.com/inscriptions/

Velanati Chodas
12th-century Indian monarchs